Manfred Nastl (born 2 January 1972) is a former Austrian footballer who played as a forward. He is currently coach.

References

External links
 
 Manfred Nastl at Footballdatabase

1973 births
Living people
Austrian footballers
FK Austria Wien players
Wiener Sport-Club players
SV Horn players
SC Eisenstadt players
Association football forwards